Zakharovo is a rural locality (a village) in Markovskoye Rural Settlement, Vologodsky District, Vologda Oblast, Russia. The population was 25 as of 2002.

Geography 
The distance to Vologda is 28 km, to Vasilyevskoye is 6 km. Glushitsa, Rogachyovo, Spass, Ivanovka are the nearest rural localities.

References 

Rural localities in Vologodsky District